The communauté de communes des Côtes et de la Ruppe is a former communauté de communes in the Vosges département and in the  Lorraine regionion of France.

Established on 24 December 1997, the association had its administrative offices at Martigny-les-Gerbonvaux. It was merged into the new Communauté de communes du Bassin de Neufchâteau in January 2013.

The Communauté de communes comprised the following communes:
Autreville
Clérey-la-Côte
Harmonville
Jubainville
Martigny-les-Gerbonvaux
Punerot
Ruppes
Tranqueville-Graux

References

Cotes et de la Ruppe